Dennis Hof's Love Ranch, known as the Cherry Patch Ranch prior to 2010, is one of two brothels in Crystal, Nevada. It is also referred to as the Love Ranch South or Love Ranch Las Vegas due to its proximity to Las Vegas.

Both brothels in Crystal were owned by Maynard "Joe" Richards. In 2010, Richards sold both to Dennis Hof, who said Heidi Fleiss would be a consultant. 

The license for the brothel was suspended in February 2018 for alleged unauthorized structural changes and fire and safety violations and then closed down by the county again on August 8, 2018, for late payment of fees.

On August 27, 2018, Judge Richard Boulware ruled that Dennis Hof may re-open Love Ranch Vegas as of August 28, 2018, stating that other brothels did not have their licenses revoked when they were late renewing.

Death of owner 
On October 16, 2018, Dennis Hof, the owner of the Love Ranch property was found dead in his bedroom at the Love Ranch. He is believed to have died in his sleep due to natural causes. Hof died at his Love Ranch in Pahrump, Nevada, following a party for his 72nd birthday that had been attended by Flavor Flav, Joe Arpaio, Grover Norquist and Ron Jeremy, the last of whom found Hof unresponsive. Police did not suspect foul play at the time of his death.

Other incidents 
On October 13, 2015, professional basketball player Lamar Odom was hospitalized after being discovered unconscious at the Love Ranch. Odom visited the ranch seeking the company of Cherry Ryder and Madison Montag.

See also
 The Love Ranch
 Prostitution in Nevada
 List of brothels in Nevada

References

External links
 "Heidi Fleiss Gives a Tour of the Love Ranch"  — April 2013 "websiode" video from the Oprah Winfrey Network
Brean, Henry (November 17, 2005). "Sex and the high desert: Bordello may offer male prostitutes". Las Vegas Review-Journal.
Brean, Henry (November 22, 2005). "Fleiss intends to go it alone on male brothel: 'Hollywood Madam' splits with business partner but presses on with Crystal plan". Las Vegas Review-Journal.

Brothels in Nevada
Buildings and structures in Nye County, Nevada